The Stormwater Management And Road Tunnel (SMART Tunnel), E38, is a storm drainage and road structure in Kuala Lumpur, Malaysia, and a major national project in the country. The  tunnel is the longest stormwater drainage tunnel in Southeast Asia and second longest in Asia.

The main objective of this tunnel is to solve the problem of flash floods in Kuala Lumpur and to reduce traffic jams along Jalan Sungai Besi and Loke Yew flyover at Pudu during rush hour. There are two components of this tunnel, the stormwater tunnel and motorway tunnel. It is the longest multi-purpose tunnel in the world.

In 2011, the SMART tunnel received the UN Habitat Scroll of Honour Award for its innovative and unique management of storm water and peak hour traffic.

It begins at Kampung Berembang lake near Klang River at Ampang and ends at Taman Desa lake near Kerayong River at Salak South. The project is led by the government, including Malaysian Highway Authority (Lembaga Lebuhraya Malaysia, LLM) and the Department of Irrigation and Drainage Malaysia (Jabatan Pengairan dan Saliran, JPS) and also a company joint venture pact between Gamuda Berhad and MMC Corporation Berhad (MMC).

Route background
The Kilometre Zero of the tunnel is located at Salak Interchange.

History
In 2001 the Government sought proposals for a solution that would allow a typical flood of three to six hours' duration to occur without flooding the city centre. A tunnel that would allow floods to bypass the centre was one way of achieving this, providing it was coupled with temporary storage facilities to keep flows downstream of Kuala Lumpur within the capacity of the river channel. A group led by Gamuda engaged SSP, a large Malaysian consultant engineering firm, and Mott MacDonald UK to develop proposals for a tunnel with holding ponds at upstream and downstream ends of the tunnel.

Construction of the tunnel began on 25 November 2003. Two Herrenknecht Tunnel Boring Machines (TBM) from Germany were used, including Tuah on north side and Gemilang on south side. Gusztáv Klados was the senior project manager of the project.

On 11 December 2003, the 13.2-m diameter Mixshield TBM, Tuah, completed a 737-m section after 24 weeks of excavation. By the end of January 2004, Tuah would start a second drive covering a distance of 4.5 km to Kampung Berembang lake. The motorway sections on the SMART system was officially opened at 3:00PM, 14 May 2007, after multiple delays.

Meanwhile, the stormwater sections on the SMART system began operations at the end of January 2007.

By 18 July 2010 the SMART system had prevented seven potentially disastrous flash floods in the city centre, having entered its first mode 3 operation only weeks after the opening of the motorway.

As of September 2020, the tunnel had activated its fourth mode for the seventh time. During the flash flood on 10 September 2020, the tunnel diverted three million cubic metres of water.

In December 2021, SMART entered Mode 4 for an eighth time, due to the massive flooding caused by heavy rainfall lasting from December 16 to 18. Things would have been much worse in Kuala Lumpur had it not been for the tunnel, which successfully diverted 5 million cubic metres of flood water during the 22 hours it was on full activation.

Functioning 

The first mode, under normal conditions where there is no storm, no flood water will be diverted into the system. When the second mode is activated, flood water is diverted into the bypass tunnel underneath the motorway tunnel. The motorway section is still open to traffic at this stage. When the third mode is in operation, the motorway will be closed to all traffic. After making sure all vehicles have exited the motorway, automated water-tight gates will be opened to allow flood waters to pass through. After the flood has ended, the tunnel is verified and cleaned via pressure-washing, and the motorway will be reopened to traffic within 48 hours of closure.

Technical specifications

Stormwater tunnel
 Construction cost: RM1,887 million (US$514.6 million)
 Stormwater tunnel length: 
 Diameter: 13.2 m (43.3 ft) (outer diameter)
 Tunnelling method: tunnel boring machine (TBM)
 TBM type: slurry shield

Motorway tunnel
 Motorway tunnel length: 
 Structure type: double deck
 Ingress and egress:  at Jalan Sultan Ismail and Jalan Imbi
 Length:   at Jalan Tun Razak
 Links:  at Kuala Lumpur–Seremban Expressway Links: City Centre near Kg. Pandan Roundabout KL–Seremban Expressway near Sungai Besi Airport

Features

 World's First Dual-Function Tunnel (Stormwater Management & Road)
 Longest tunnel in Malaysia
 9.7 km (6.03 miles) stormwater by-pass tunnel
 4 km (2.49 miles) double-deck motorway within stormwater tunnel
 The motorway tunnel is suitable for light vehicles only. Motorcycles and heavy vehicles are not allowed
 Ingress and egress connections to the motorway tunnel linking the southern gateway to the city centre
 Holding basin complete with diversion and tunnel intake structures
 Storage reservoir and a twin-box culvert to release flood discharge
 State-of-the-art operations control room equipped with the latest systems in operations management, surveillance and maintenance of the SMART system.
 Custom-made fire engine units consisting of two modified Toyota Hilux pickup trucks, parked at two different locations for quick access to the tunnel in case of fire on both carriageways.

Tolls
The SMART Tunnel motorway using opened toll systems. All toll transactions at this toll plaza is only allowed with Touch 'n Go cards or SmartTAG.

Toll rates

Toll charges can only be paid with the Touch 'n Go cards or SmartTAG. Cash payment is not accepted.

FM radio channels available

List of interchanges

The entire expressway had its speed limit of 60 km/h.

From/to E37 East–West Link Expressway

From/to E37 Kuala Lumpur–Seremban Expressway

Motorway tunnel

Sultan Ismail link tunnel

Tunnel in popular culture
 The SMART Tunnel was featured in an episode of Extreme Engineering on the Discovery Channel.
 The SMART Tunnel was featured in an episode of Truly Malaysia on the National Geographic Channel and TV1.
 The SMART Tunnel was featured in an episode of Man Made Marvels on the Science Channel.
 The SMART Tunnel was featured in an episode of Megastructures on the National Geographic Channel and TV1.
 The SMART Tunnel was featured in episode 2, Season 1, of Build It Bigger on the Science Channel.

See also
 List of long tunnels by type

References

External links
 SMART Tunnel
 MMC Corporation Berhad
 Department of Irrigation and Drainage Malaysia
 SMART Tunnel - Mott MacDonald Project Page

2007 establishments in Malaysia
Expressways in Malaysia
Expressways and highways in the Klang Valley
Tunnels completed in 2007
Toll tunnels in Malaysia
Water tunnels
Drainage tunnels
Flood control in Asia
Flood control projects